Muhammad Zia Hamdard was appointed as the 14th governor of Daykundi Province on 14 May 2020. He left office on July 13, 2021.

References

Governors of Daykundi Province
Year of birth missing (living people)
Living people
Place of birth missing (living people)
Hazara politicians